Olavius is a genus of oligochaete worms, first described by Christer Erséus in 1984.

Members of the genus are found in the waters of Queensland and Western Australia, off the coasts of Fiji and the Solomon Islands at depths of 200 m.

Subdivisions 
The following subdivisions are currently accepted within the genus Olavius.

Subgenus Olavius (Coralliodriloides) 
 Olavius (Coralliodriloides) avisceralis (Erséus, 1981)
 Olavius (Coralliodriloides) fredi Erséus, 1997
 Olavius (Coralliodriloides) hanssoni Erséus, 1984
 Olavius (Coralliodriloides) loisae Erséus, 1984
 Olavius (Coralliodriloides) mokapuensis Erséus & Davis, 1989
 Olavius (Coralliodriloides) rottnestensis Erséus, 1993
 Olavius (Coralliodriloides) strigosus Erséus & Davis, 1989

Subgenus Olavius (Olavius) 
 Olavius (Olavius) alius Erséus, 1984
 Olavius (Olavius) longissimus (Giere, 1979)
 Olavius (Olavius) pravus Erséus, 1990
 Olavius (Olavius) tantulus Erséus, 1984

Other species 

 Olavius abrolhosensis Erséus, 1997
 Olavius albidoides Erséus, 1997
 Olavius albidus (Jamieson, 1977)
 Olavius algarvensis Giere, Erséus & Stuhlmacher, 1998
 Olavius amplectens Erséus & Bergfeldt, 2007
 Olavius avitus Erséus, 2003
 Olavius bullatus Finogenova, 1986
 Olavius capillus Erséus, 1997
 Olavius caudatus (Erséus, 1979)
 Olavius clavatus (Erséus, 1981)
 Olavius comorensis (Erséus, 1981)
 Olavius cornuatus Davis, 1984
 Olavius crassitunicatus Finogenova, 1986
 Olavius curtus Erséus, 2003
 Olavius fidelis Erséus & Bergfeldt, 2007
 Olavius filithecatus (Erséus, 1981)
 Olavius finitimus Erséus, 1990
 Olavius furinus Erséus, 2003
 Olavius fusus Erséus, 1993
 Olavius geniculatus (Erséus, 1981)
 Olavius gierei Erséus, 1997
 Olavius hamulatus Erséus, 1997
 Olavius ilvae Giere & Erséus, 2002
 Olavius imperfectus Erséus, 1984
 Olavius isomerus Erséus & Bergfeldt, 2007
 Olavius latus Erséus, 1986
 Olavius lifouensis Erséus & Bergfeldt, 2007
 Olavius macer Erséus, 1984
 Olavius manifae Erséus, 1985
 Olavius montebelloensis Erséus, 1997
 Olavius muris Erséus, 2003
 Olavius nicolae Erséus & Giere, 1995
 Olavius nivalis Erséus & Bergfeldt, 2007
 Olavius paraloisae Erséus & Bergfeldt, 2007
 Olavius parapellucidus Erséus & Davis, 1989
 Olavius patriciae Erséus, 1993
 Olavius pellucidus Erséus, 1984
 Olavius planus (Erséus, 1979)
 Olavius prodigus Erséus, 1993
 Olavius productus Erséus, 1997
 Olavius propinquus Erséus, 1984
 Olavius rallus Erséus, 1991
 Olavius separatus Erséus, 1993
 Olavius soror Erséus, 2003
 Olavius tannerensis Erséus, 1991
 Olavius tenuissimus (Erséus, 1979)
 Olavius ullae Erséus, 2003
 Olavius ulrikae Erséus, 2008
 Olavius vacuus Erséus, 1990
 Olavius valens Erséus, 1997
 Olavius verpa Erséus, 1985

References

Further reading
Diaz, Robert J., and Christer Erseus. "Habitat preferences and species associations of shallow-water marine Tubificidae (Oligochaeta) from the barrier reef ecosystems off Belize, Central America." Aquatic Oligochaete Biology V. Springer Netherlands, 1994. 93-105.
Giere, Olav, et al. "A comparative structural study on bacterial symbioses of Caribbean gutless Tubificidae (Annelida, Oligochaeta)." Acta zoologica 76.4 (1995): 281–290.
Dubilier, Nicole, Anna Blazejak, and Caroline Rühland. "Symbioses between bacteria and gutless marine oligochaetes." Molecular Basis of Symbiosis. Springer Berlin Heidelberg, 2006. 251–275.

Tubificina
Annelid genera
Taxa named by Christer Erséus